The Government Pension Offset (GPO) is a statutory provision in United States law which affects benefits paid by the Social Security Administration. It reduces spousal Social Security retirement benefits in situations where the spouse did not pay Social Security taxes on their employment earnings. (Many state and local government employees and other non-covered pension recipients do not contribute to the Social Security system.) One exception to this provision occurs when the spouse is receiving a foreign pension for a different country, in which case the Government Pension Offset is not applied (unlike the Windfall Elimination Provision, which also applies to foreign pensions and benefits that the number holder receives). This is in contrast to the Windfall Elimination Provision (WEP), which reduces Social Security benefits of the actual number holder on whose Social Security record the claim is filed.

Effects on benefits 
Social security benefits are reduced by two-thirds of the non-covered government pension amount. Note this is not two-thirds of the Social Security benefit; for example, a $600 non-covered pension benefit would reduce Social Security spousal benefits by $400, regardless of whether the spouse was entitled to $500 or $1000 on the Social Security record of the number holder.

See also 
 Retirement Insurance Benefits
 Disability Insurance Benefits
 Windfall Elimination Provision

Notes

External links 
 www.ssa.gov / Alternate - Official website of the Social Security Administration
 Details of the 1983 Amendments

Social security in the United States